Pharo is an open source, cross-platform implementation of the classic Smalltalk-80 programming language and runtime. It's based on the OpenSmalltalk virtual machine called Cog (VM),  which evaluates a dynamic, reflective, and object-oriented programming language with a syntax closely resembling Smalltalk-80.

Pharo is shipped with a source code compiled into a system image that contains all software necessary to run Pharo system. Like the original Smalltalk-80, Pharo provides several live programming features such as immediate object manipulation, live updates, and just-in-time compilation. The image includes an IDE-like software to modify its components.

Pharo was forked from Squeak v3.9 in March of 2008.

Overview 
 
Pharo is a pure object-oriented dynamically typed and reflective language. The stated goal of Pharo is to revisit Smalltalk design and enhance it.  

The name Pharo comes from the French word "phare" which means lighthouse. This is why the Pharo logo shows a drawing of a lighthouse inside the final letter O of the name.

Key features

Virtual machine 

 Multiplatform virtual machine with JIT, combined generational garbage collector, ephemerons, forwarders
 Fast object enumeration
 Easy call stack manipulation
 AST metalinks
 Relatively low memory consumption
 Customizable compiler
 Optional complete object memory persistence
 Resumable exceptions
 Fast object serialization

Built-in software 
 Optional fusion of developed program and development environment
Live object inspection

Language features 

 Simple syntax

 Object-oriented programming
 Immediate object identity swapping
 Dynamic inheritance
 Objects as methods
 Optional Green threads
 Customizable metaclasses
 Easy to use proxy objects

Relation to Smalltalk 

Pharo is based on general concepts of Smalltalk but seeks to improve on them so does not limit itself to them. The basic syntax of the language has a close resemblance to Smalltalk. However, the way classes are defined in Pharo differs from other Smalltalk dialects.

Language syntax 

The Pharo syntax is based on Smalltalk-80 language syntax with several extensions. Some of these are common among modern Smalltalk dialects.

 literals for dynamic arrays. The expressions that specify the array content are evaluated in time of the program execution
{1. 2. 1+2}
 literals for byte arrays that can be composed only of integer numbers in the range from 0 to 255 
#[1 2 3 4]
 literals for scaled decimals, a representation of fixed point decimal numbers able to accurately represent decimal fractions 
3.14s2
 pragmas. In Smalltalk-80 the pragmas are used only for primitive methods. In Pharo they are fully capable method annotations
<gtInspectorPresentationOrder: 30>
 two double quotes inside a comment are interpreted as a single double quotes character that is part of the content of the comment 

The Pharo language syntax is supposed to be very simple and minimalistic. The basic language elements are often presented on a single postcard. The grammar is classified as LL(1).

The language grammar does not specify directly how the code should be stored in files. Pharo uses Tonel as the preferred code serialization format.

History 
Pharo emerged as a fork of Squeak, an open-source Smalltalk environment created by the Smalltalk-80 team (Dan Ingalls and Alan Kay). Pharo was created by S. Ducasse  and M. Denker in March 2008. It focuses on modern software engineering and development techniques. Pharo is supported by the Pharo consortium (for legal entities)  and the Pharo association for physical persons .

Use of Pharo

Companies and consultants 
Some companies use Pharo for their development projects. In particular, they use:

 Seaside for dynamic web development
 Zinc for server architectures
  Moose to analyse data and software from all programming languages
 Graphic libraries for evolved user interfaces
 Roassal to visualize data 

The Pharo consortium was created for companies wishing to support the Pharo project. The Pharo association was created in 2011 for users wishing to support the project.

Performance and virtual machine (VM) 
Pharo relies on a virtual machine that is written almost entirely in Smalltalk itself. Beginning in 2008, a new virtual machine (Cog) for Squeak, Pharo and Newspeak has been developed that has a level of performance close to the fastest Smalltalk virtual machine. In 2014/2015 the VM community is working on Spur, a new Memory Manager for Cog that should again increase performance and provide better 64-bit VM support.

See also 
 Amber Smalltalk
 GNU Smalltalk
 Squeak
 VisualWorks

References

External links 
 

Class-based programming languages
Dynamically typed programming languages
Smalltalk programming language family
Software using the MIT license